Big Love is a TV series.

Big Love may also refer to:

 Big Love (play), a 2000 play by Charles L. Mee
 Big Love (Tracy Byrd album), 1996
"Big Love" (Tracy Byrd song)
 Big Love (Simply Red album), 2015
 Big Love (Ali Campbell album), 1995
 "Big Love" (Fleetwood Mac song), 1987
 "Big Love" (The Bellamy Brothers song), 1989
 "Big Love", a song by Pete Heller
 "Big Love", a song by The Black Eyed Peas, 2018
 "Big Love", a song by Little Village from the album Little Village, 1992
 bigLove, a 2001 short film
 The Big Love, a 1961 book by Florence Aadland, and Tedd Thomey

See also
 BigBigLove'', an album by Little Birdy